Bertha is an unincorporated community in Burt County, Nebraska, United States.

History
A post office was established at Bertha in 1890, closed temporarily in 1895, reopened in 1898, and closed permanently in 1900.

References

Unincorporated communities in Burt County, Nebraska
Unincorporated communities in Nebraska